Henry Sparrow (13 June 1889 – 13 June 1973) was an English professional footballer who played for Faversham Thursday, Portsmouth, Sittingbourne, Croydon Common, Leicester Fosse, Tottenham Hotspur and Margate.

Football career 
Sparrow began his career at his local Non League club Faversham Thursday. He later went on to play for Portsmouth and Croydon Common before joining Leicester Fosse in 1911. The centre forward featured in 48 matches and scored 29 goals between 1911 and 1913. In 1913, Sparrow signed for Tottenham Hotspur where he played a total of 19 matches and scored on seven occasions in all competitions. After leaving White Hart Lane he played for Margate where he ended his playing career.

References 

1889 births
1973 deaths
People from Faversham
English footballers
English Football League players
Portsmouth F.C. players
Croydon Common F.C. players
Leicester City F.C. players
Tottenham Hotspur F.C. players
Margate F.C. players
Sittingbourne F.C. players
Association football forwards